Vinjeronden is a mountain in Innlandet county, Norway. The  mountain is a tri-point that lies on the border of the three municipalities of Dovre, Folldal, and Sel. The mountain Rondeslottet lies immediately to the north, the mountains Storronden and Rondvasshøgde lie to the southeast, and Svartnuten lies to the southwest. 

The mountain is easily accessed by hiking from the Rondvassbu tourist cabin (run by the Norwegian Mountain Touring Association), on the way from Rondvassbu to Rondeslottet, which is the highest mountain in Rondane.

Name
The first part of the mountain name comes from the poet and writer Aasmund Olavsson Vinje. The last part of the name comes from the word  which was probably the original name of the nearby lake Rondvatnet. Many of the mountains near the lake were then named after this lake.

See also
List of mountains of Norway

References

Mountains of Innlandet
Folldal
Dovre
Sel